Stephen Joel Albert (6 February 1941 – 27 December 1992) was an American composer. He is best known for his Symphony No. 1 RiverRun (1983) and Cello Concerto (1990) written for Yo-Yo Ma, both of which won a Pulitzer Prize for Music. He died suddenly in a 1992 automobile accident, having just sketched out his Second Symphony. The work was subsequently completed by Sebastian Currier, and his death sparked musical tributes from composer colleagues such as Aaron Jay Kernis and Christopher Rouse.

Life and career
Born in New York City, Albert began his musical training on the piano, French horn, and trumpet as a youngster. He first studied composition at the age of 15 with Elie Siegmeister, and enrolled two years later at the Eastman School of Music, where he studied with Darius Milhaud and Bernard Rogers (1958–1960) Following composition lessons in Stockholm with Karl-Birger Blomdahl, Albert studied with Joseph Castaldo at the Philadelphia Musical Academy (BM 1962); in 1963 he worked with George Rochberg at the University of Pennsylvania. In 1965 he won a Rome Fellowship to study in Rome at the American Academy.

From 1985 to 1988 he worked as the Seattle Symphony's composer-in-residence.

His notable students included Daniel Asia and Dan Coleman.

Albert was killed in an automobile accident in Truro, Massachusetts on Cape Cod on 27 December 1992.

Awards and honors
Stephen Albert won the 1985 Pulitzer Prize for Music for his Symphony No. 1, RiverRun.  He posthumously won a Grammy Award in 1995 in the Best Classical Contemporary Composition category for his Cello Concerto as performed by Yo-Yo Ma in a 1990 recording with the Baltimore Symphony Orchestra, conducted by David Zinman.

Aaron Jay Kernis dedicated his 1993 composition for piano quartet Still Movement with Hymn in memory of Albert.  The slow movement of Christopher Rouse's 1994 Symphony No. 2 is also dedicated to the memory of Albert, who was a colleague and close friend of Rouse.

Works
A number of Albert's works were based on James Joyce texts. Finnegans Wake inspired three of Albert's pieces: To Wake the Dead, TreeStone, and Symphony RiverRun.  Albert's paired "Distant Hills" arias Flower of the Mountain and Sun's Heat were based on Ulysses, and the song "Ecce Puer" from Joyce's poem of the same name. 

His famous Concerto for Violoncello and Orchestra started out as a request by the Baltimore Symphony in 1987 for a 15-minute orchestral piece.  In 1988 the commission was changed to a concerto for Yo-Yo Ma. The composer credited Ma with his help completing the work. Albert started with material drawn two earlier works from 1988, "Anthem and Processionals" and "The Stone Harp." He started the composition in 1989 and finished in 1990. The premiere was on 31 March 1990 and featured Yo-Yo Ma along with the Baltimore Symphony Orchestra conducted by David Zinman. A revised version was featured on a 1993 album, "The New York Album."

According to Yo-Yo Ma, the composition was a "kind of catharsis." It incorporated struggles in his life, including his writer's blocks and the death of his father. The work is dedicated to the memory of his father.

Orchestral
 Anthems and Processionals (1988) – 16 minutes
 Into Eclipse (chamber with voice version) (1981) – 30 minutes
 Symphony No. 1 RiverRun (1983) – 33 minutes
 Symphony No. 2 (1992) – 30 minutes (orchestration completed by Sebastian Currier)
 Tapioca Pudding (1991) – 2 minutes

Concertante
 Concerto for Violoncello and Orchestra (1990) – 30 minutes
 Distant Hills (orchestra version) (1989) – 31 minutes
 Flower of the Mountain from "Distant Hills" (orchestra version) (1985) – 16 minutes
 In Concordiam (1986) – 17 minutes
 Into Eclipse (orchestra with voice version) (1981) – 30 minutes
 Sun's Heat from "Distant Hills" (orchestra version) (1989) – 15 minutes
 Winter Canticle (1991) – 14 minutes
 Wolf Time (1968) – 20 minutes

Ensemble (7 or more players)
 Distant Hills (chamber version) (1989) – 31 minutes
 Flower of the Mountain from "Distant Hills" (chamber version) (1985) – 16 minutes
 Sun's Heat from "Distant Hills" (chamber version) (1989) – 15 minutes
 TreeStone (1983) – 45 minutes

Chamber
 Tribute (1988) – 9 minutes

Choral
 Bacchae: A Ceremony in Music (1967) – 8 minutes

Vocal
 Ecce Puer (1992) – 6 minutes
 Rilke Song – On Nights Like This (1991) – 5 minutes
 The Stone Harp (1988) – 14 minutes
 To Wake the Dead (1977) – 25 minutes
 Wedding Songs (1964) – 10 minutes

References

External links
 G. Schirmer: Stephen Albert Composer profile and work list
 Art of the States: Stephen Albert To Wake the Dead (1978) complete work in streaming audio with accompanying program notes
 Website devoted to Stephen Albert (stephenalbertcomposer.com)

Interviews
 Stephen Albert interview, 9 December 1990

20th-century classical composers
Pulitzer Prize for Music winners
Grammy Award winners
1941 births
1992 deaths
University of the Arts (Philadelphia) alumni
Musicians from New York City
Eastman School of Music alumni
University of Pennsylvania alumni
Road incident deaths in Massachusetts
Pupils of Darius Milhaud
20th-century American composers
20th-century American male musicians